Adoxophyes cyrtosema is a species of moth of the family Tortricidae. It is found in Tonga, on the New Hebrides and in China (Guangzhou, Fujian).

The larvae have been recorded feeding on litchi and longan.

References

Moths described in 1886
Adoxophyes
Moths of Oceania
Moths of Asia